Packard Bell Navigator is an alternative shell for the Windows 3.1 and Windows 95 operating systems that shipped with Packard Bell computers. The shell was designed to be simpler to use for computer novices by representing applications as objects in a virtual home, similar to Microsoft Bob and At Ease. The software was originally developed by a company called Ark Interface, which was acquired by Packard Bell in 1994.

Design and functionality 
Most pre-1995 versions contained a GUI very similar to Apple Computer's At Ease, but without the folders.  Unlike At Ease, programs were grouped in sections such as "Microsoft DOS", "Microsoft Windows", "Service & Support", and "Software". The "Software" section was the only section users could customise and modify program icons, paths, and links. The above sections appeared as icons at startup.

Navigator was a standard Windows program, meaning when the computer was booted, Windows would start and load Navigator from the startup directory. If the Windows icon in Navigator was clicked, the program would become minimized. If Navigator was removed from the Startup folder, it would not load at Windows startup. This is similar to the design of Microsoft Bob, which ran on top of Windows, and At Ease, which ran on top of the classic Mac OS Finder.

It was possible for Navigator to function on non-Packard Bell Windows PCs.

Packard Bell Navigator shipped with Packard Bell personal computers in the mid 1990s. A 3D version, named Packard Bell 3D Navigator, shipped in 2000–2001.

Security, user accounts, and passwords 
Unlike At Ease, which allowed multiple password-protected user accounts, Navigator only allowed password protection on each of the sections (only one password).  However, multiple user accounts were not possible.  All users were granted the same privileges.

References

External links 
 Toasty Technology GUI Gallery - Navigator 1.1 and Navigator 3.5
 Packard Bell Navigator 1.0, 2.0, 3.0 and 3.9

Desktop shell replacement
Packard Bell